David Nachmias (Δαυίδ Ναχμίας) is a Greek musician, notable for his involvement in vintage Greek music.

Early life and education 
David Nachmias was born on 19 March 1966 in Bombay to a Greek family, but grew up in Athens.

He attended the American Community School Athens for six years, and then  St. Lawrence College. He graduated from the University of La Verne earned a bachelor's degree in psychology. For 15 years he studied piano, music theory and orchestration at the National Conservatory of Athens.

Career

On radio
From 1988 to 1989 he worked as a radio co-presenter alongside actress Mary Chronopoulou at TOP FM radio and from 2001 to 2002 he broadcast on the Greek National classical music station Trito Programma.

He currently broadcasts a daily radio program, focusing on vintage Greek music at Deftero Programma 103.7 Hellenic Broadcasting Corporation.

Since November 2016 he has transferred his TV show TIMIS ENEKEN on Trito Programma radio, broadcasting every Saturday at 13:00 Greek local time

On television
In 2001  he directed  and presented two weekly TV shows entitled Ihnilates (tracers) and Timis Eneken (honoris causa) on the Greek National Television channel.  He interviewed more than 200 Greek cultural figures including poet Antonis Fostieris, poet Manolis Pratikakis, poet Katerina Anghelaki-Rooke, actor Kostas Kazakos, Greek National Opera baritone Themis Sermie and shadow theatre artist Evgenios Spatharis.

He also directed and presented several documentaries on historic cultural personalities including singer and composer Nikos Gounaris,  lyricist Pythagoras Papastamatiou, composer Michalis Souyioul, actress Sapfo Notara, movie director Orestis Laskos and military officer Mordehai Frizis.

Interwar songs
Since 2001, he has been involved in Greek nostalgic music, particularly songs from the early twentieth century. He has arranged songs from original sheet music for contemporary orchestras.

He has performed alongside singers such as Hrysoula Stefanaki, and Sia Koskina.

In September 2010 and 2011 Nachmias organized a vintage Greek music show at the Houston Grand Opera under the auspices of Hellenic Cultural Center of the Southwest,  performing Hrysoula Stefanaki.

Discography

2007 Attik Tribute
Produced by Protasis Music, organized and orchestrated by David Nachmias, the CD includes 18 songs by the foremost Greek composer Attik (1885–1944) performed by Nena Venetsanou, Maria Kanelopoulou, Thanos Polydoras, Hrysoula Stefanaki, Gogo Vaghena, Pandelis Psyhas, Babis Tsertos and Themis Andreadis.

2010 From Attik to Gounaris (Greek vintage songs compilation)
Greek vintage song selection covering the period 1901 to 1959.  
Singers Maria Kanelopoulou, Hrysoula Stefanaki, and Thanos Polydoras, perform famous songs of Nikos Gounaris, Danai, Hristos Hairopoulos, Alekos Sakellarios, Mihalis Sougioul,Kostas Giannidis, Cesare Andrea Bixio, Nikos Hatziapostolou, Leo Rapitis and Sofia Vembo. This CD is a live recording.

References

External links 
 Hellenic Cultural Center of the Southwest
 

1966 births
Musicians from Athens
Greek pianists
Mass media people from Athens
Greek television journalists
Greek Jews
Living people
21st-century pianists